Tutuba is an island in Vanuatu, located off the coast of Vanuatu's largest island Espiritu Santo in Sanma Province.

Population
The small local population of Tutuba of some 600 people live in villages along the north-western shore. The local inhabitants speak the Tutuba language.

Geography
The island is quite small being 7.0 km long and just 2.5 km wide at the widest point. According to the Lonely Planet guide, "golden beaches line Tutuba's west coast."

References

Islands of Vanuatu
Sanma Province